Rhodamnia whiteana, known as the cliff malletwood or White's malletwood   is a sub-tropical rainforest plant of eastern Australia.

It is named in honour of the botanist C.T.White. The Generic name Rhodamnia is derived from the Greek Rhodon which means "rose". And , "bowl" where the blood of lambs was poured after sacrifice. It refers to the bowl shaped calyx tubes.

Cliff malletwood occurs on the edge of sub tropical rainforest or dry rainforest. Often associated with Hoop Pine, on shallow basalt soil in high rainfall areas. Particularly on the state border of New South Wales and Queensland.

A small to mid-sized tree with a dense canopy, up to 20 metres high and a stem diameter of 35 cm. Often multi-stemmed, with up to 12 stems from the same root base.

Leaves are 5 to 9.5 cm long, 1.5 to 3 cm wide  Dark green above, pale or whitish below. The leaf stalk is grooved, 5 to 10 mm long. Oil dots may clearly be seen under a lens. The bark is soft, papery and fissured, grey brown in colour. Small white flowers appear in December to January. The fruit is a berry, starting green, then turning yellow, orange, red, then black; around 10 mm in diameter. The fruit contains six to ten seeds.

References

Myrtales of Australia
Flora of New South Wales
Flora of Queensland
whiteana